The 2018 Supercupa României was the 20th edition of the Supercupa României, the annual super cup in Romania.

The game was contested by the winners of the previous season's Liga I and Cupa României competitions, CFR Cluj and Universitatea Craiova respectively. It was played at the Ion Oblemenco Stadium in Craiova, on 14 July 2018.

CFR Cluj claimed the trophy after defeating Universitatea Craiova 1–0, with Emmanuel Culio scoring the only goal of the game. Before the match, CFR had reached the Supercupa României four times, winning two (2009, 2010) and being runners-up two times (2012, 2016); U Craiova had never took part in the contest.

Teams

Venue

The Stadionul Ion Oblemenco was announced as the venue of the Super Cup at the Romanian Football Federation Executive Committee meeting on 7 May 2018. This was the first Supercupa României hosted in Craiova.
The new Ion Oblemenco Stadium opened in November 2017. It is the home stadium of Universitatea Craiova.

The venue was chosen before the two participants were known. By winning the Romanian Cup, Universitatea Craiova earned the opportunity to play for the Supercup in their home stadium.

Match

Details

Statistics

Post-match
Edward Iordănescu won his first trophy as a manager. The penalty netted by Emmanuel Culio was the first to be awarded in the competition, despite being played intermittently since 1994.

CFR Cluj's Ciprian Deac won the player of the match award, a distinction he had also received at the 2010 edition.

References

External links
Romania - List of Super Cup Finals, RSSSF.com

2018–19 in Romanian football
Supercupa României
CFR Cluj matches
CS Universitatea Craiova matches
Craiova
July 2018 sports events in Europe